Kirill Semyonovich Moskalenko (11 May 1902 – 17 June 1985) was a Marshal of the Soviet Union. A member of the Soviet Army who fought in both the Russian Civil War and World War II, he later served as Commander in Chief of Strategic Missile Forces and Inspector General for the Ministry of Defense.

Early life
Moskalenko was born in the village of Grishino, Bakhmutsky Uyezd, Yekaterinoslav Governorate, Russian Empire (present-day Pokrovsk Raion, Donetsk Oblast, Ukraine), in a family of Ukrainian peasants. He graduated from a four-year primary rural school and two classes of the school of the ministerial school. From 1917 to 1919 he studied at an agricultural school in Bakhmut, where poet Volodymyr Sosiura studied at the same time according to his recollections. He was forced to interrupt his studies due to the outbreak of the Russian Civil War.

Military career

Russian Civil War
He returned to his native village, where worked in the rural revolutionary committee. When the province of his village was seized by the troops of the Volunteer Army of General Anton Denikin, he hid because of the threat of execution. After the occupation of the village by the troops of the Red Army in August 1920, he joined their ranks.

Moskalenko fought in the civil war while serving as the member of the First Cavalry Army. He fought against the troops of General Pyotr Wrangel and Ataman Nestor Makhno.

Post civil war
He studied at the Luhansk Artillery School and at the 2nd Kharkov Artillery School. In May 1921, he was transferred to the artillery department of the Kharkov School of Red Officers, from which he graduated in 1922. Later, he graduated from the advanced training courses for the command personnel at the Red Army Artillery Academy in Leningrad and the faculty of advanced training for the higher command personnel of the Felix Dzerzhinsky Military Academy in Moscow Oblast. During his studies in Kharkov, as part of the school, he participated in battles against gangs in the Don and Donbas regions.

From 1922 to 1932 he served in the 6th Cavalry Division and First Cavalry Army, and platoon commander of the Cavalry Artillery Division. During his service in Armavir, he participated in battles against political banditry in the North Caucasus.

In September 1923, together with a military unit, he was transferred to Bryansk. From 1924, he served as a battery commander. He later served as commander of a training battery, artillery battalion, and chief of staff of an artillery regiment from 1928.

From 1932, he served as chief of staff and commander of a special cavalry division of the Special Red Banner Far Eastern Army near Chita. From 1934, he served commander of a cavalry regiment. Moskalenko commanded the 23rd Tank Brigade in Primorsky Krai from 1935. From 1936 he served in the 45th Mechanized Corps within the Kiev Military District.

World War II

During the Soviet-Finnish War, he was the commander of artillery for the 51st Rifle Division and was awarded the Order of the Red Banner. He successively chief of artillery of the 35th Rifle Corps and the 2nd Mechanized Corps in Chisinau and Tiraspol respectively.

When Operation Barbarossa began in June 1941, Moskalenko was the commander of an anti-tank brigade which was stationed in Lutsk. Between June 1941, and March 1942, Moskalenko first held command of the 1st Anti-Tank Brigade, 15th Rifle Corps, 6th Army, and later of the 6th Cavalry Corps. During this time, he took part in the defensive battles in Lutsk, Volodymyr-Volynskyi, Rovno, Torchyn, Novohrad-Volynskyi and Malyn. Moskalenko participated in the Kiev Strategic Defensive Operation and fought in battles near Teterev, Pripyat, Dnieper and Desna. During a month of continuous fighting, being in the direction of the main attack of the enemy Army Group South, the brigade destroyed more than 300 enemy tanks. For military successes, courage and bravery, he was awarded the Order of Lenin on 23 July 1941.

In December 1941, he was appointed deputy commander of the 6th Army of the Southwestern Front and acting commander of the army. The 6th Army under the command Moskalenko took part in the Barvenkovo-Lozovaya offensive and the liberation of the cities of Izium and Lozova. On 12 February 1942, he was appointed as commander of the 6th Cavalry Corps and from March to July 1942, he served as commander of the 38th Army. He was the commander of the newly reformed 38th Army from March to July 1942.

During the Battle of Stalingrad, he commanded the 1st Tank Army during which he participated in battles on the distant approaches to Stalingrad from July to August 1942. In August 1942, he was appointed commander of the 1st Guards Army until October 1942. At the very beginning of the defensive period of the Battle of Stalingrad, the 1st Tank Army attacked the enemy almost continuously for twelve days in a row and held back their advance. According to Moskalenko, at Kalach-on-Don, his army stopped the advance of German General Friedrich Paulus's 6th Army to Stalingrad and almost won a month to organize defense in depth and pull up reserves. He was then appointed commander of the 1st Tank Army from July to August 1942 and the 1st Guards Army from August to October 1942 before finally receiving command of the 40th Army, which was separate from the Voronezh Front, a position he held until October 1943.

Moskalenko led his troops during the winter counteroffensive and during the Battle of Kursk. He participated in the Ostrogozhsk–Rossosh offensive, third battle of Kharkov and the battle of the Dnieper. Moskalenko was awarded the title Hero of the Soviet Union for heroism and courage when crossing the Dnieper and securing a bridgehead on its western bank.

From October 1943 until the end of the war, Moskalenko was the commander of the 38th Army. He led his troops as they helped drive the Germans from the Ukraine, Poland, and Czechoslovakia.

Post-World War II

After the war, Moskalenko commanded the 38th Army, which was transferred to the Carpathian Military District. From August 1948, he served as commander of the Air Defense Forces of the Moscow Region. He served in various capacities in the Moscow Military District, before being appointed its Commanding General in 1953.

On 26 June 1953 the CPSU Secretary Khrushchev along with Marshals Georgy Zhukov and Kirill Moskalenko secretly arrested First Deputy Prime Minister of the USSR Beria during a joint CPSU Presidium and Cabinet meeting. While Zhukov could not carry a gun into the Kremlin, Moskalenko sneaked into the Kremlin with a gun to arrest Beria. During the next six months, he and Rudenko investigated the "Beria Case". In December 1953 the Soviet Supreme Court found Beria guilty after a five-day proceeding. On December 23, Beria was shot. Another version states that Beria was shot by machine gun during the military assault on his residential compound in Moscow.

As a result of this operation, on 11 March 1955, Moskalenko, along with five other commanders, was given the rank of Marshal of the Soviet Union. Moskalenko remained in the Moscow Military District until 1960, when he was made Commander-in-Chief of the Strategic Rocket Forces. Moskalenko owed his very rapid promotion to having served with Khrushchev during the war. In his memoirs, Khrushchev said:

Khrushchev also claimed to have been shocked by the virulence with which Moskalenko denounced Marshal Zhukov in 1957, when Khrushchev had decided to sack Zhukov, but even so, he remained in office until April 1962, when he was dismissed without any reason being given, and was made an Inspector General of the Ministry of Defense. an honorary post of no significance. The French journalist Michel Tatu, who was based in Moscow at the time, surmised that his fall was related to the Cuban Missile Crisis:

For his services in the development and strengthening of the Armed Forces of the USSR, he was awarded the title Hero of the Soviet Union for the second time on 1978. From December 1983, he was part of the Group of Inspectors General of the USSR Ministry of Defense. Moskalenko died on 17 June 1985. His body was buried in Novodevichy Cemetery.

Honours and awards

Soviet Union

Foreign

Other honors
The Poltava Military School of Communications was named in honor of him.
Honorary Citizen of the city of Tiraspol 
Streets named after him in Pokrovsk, Horlivka and Vinnytsia
A bronze bust honoring him in Pokrovsk

References

Bibliography 
Marshal K.S. Moskalenko (Commander of the 38th Army), On South-Western direction, Moscow, Science, 1969
Marshal K.S. Moskalenko (Commander of the 38th Army), On South-Western direction, 1943 -1945, Moscow, Science, 1972

External links
Generals.dk

1902 births
1985 deaths
People from Donetsk Oblast
People from Bakhmutsky Uyezd
Central Committee of the Communist Party of the Soviet Union members
Second convocation members of the Soviet of Nationalities
Third convocation members of the Soviet of Nationalities
Fourth convocation members of the Soviet of Nationalities
Fifth convocation members of the Soviet of Nationalities
Sixth convocation members of the Soviet of Nationalities
Seventh convocation members of the Soviet of Nationalities
Eighth convocation members of the Soviet of Nationalities
Ninth convocation members of the Soviet of Nationalities
Tenth convocation members of the Soviet of Nationalities
Eleventh convocation members of the Soviet of Nationalities
Marshals of the Soviet Union
Soviet military personnel of the Russian Civil War
Soviet military personnel of the Winter War
Soviet military personnel of World War II
Heroes of the Soviet Union
Recipients of the Order of Lenin
Recipients of the Order of Suvorov, 1st class
Recipients of the Order of the Red Banner
Recipients of the Order of Kutuzov, 1st class
Recipients of the Order of Bogdan Khmelnitsky (Soviet Union), 1st class
Heroes of the Czechoslovak Socialist Republic
Burials at Novodevichy Cemetery
Recipients of the Order "For Service to the Homeland in the Armed Forces of the USSR", 3rd class
Grand Crosses of the Order of the White Lion
Recipients of the Military Order of the White Lion
Honorary Knights Commander of the Order of the British Empire
Recipients of the Order of the Cross of Grunwald, 2nd class
Recipients of the Czechoslovak War Cross
Ukrainian people of World War II
Knights of the Order of Polonia Restituta